Dunnville is an unincorporated community with a post office  in southern Casey County, Kentucky, United States, near the intersection of the Green River and Goose Creek. It was named for Virginian James Richard Dunn, who settled the area in the 1840s and operated a mill.

Today, several sawmills and Tarter Gate, the world's largest manufacturer of animal management equipment, are located there, as Casey County is known for the manufacture of tubular gates and related farm equipment. The post office was first opened on July 3, 1879. It is also known for the "World Famous" Dogwalk Market. There are several churches in the area and a computer repair shop.

References

Unincorporated communities in Casey County, Kentucky
Unincorporated communities in Kentucky